Yao Yilin (September 6, 1917 – December 11, 1994) was a Vice Premier of the People's Republic of China from 1979 to 1988, and the country's First Vice Premier from 1988 to 1993.

Early life and career
He was born in Hong Kong in 1917, and spent his early years in Guichi, Anhui. Yao joined the Chinese Communist Party in 1935. During the December 9th Movement, Yao was the secretary of the Beijing city Party study group. During the Second Sino-Japanese War, he became the vice-director of the Finance Office of the Communist-controlled area. This began a long period of leadership in financial positions. In 1979, Yao became the Vice-Premier of the State Council. At the 13th National Congress of the Chinese Communist Party in 1987, Yao was elected to the Politburo Standing Committee of the Chinese Communist Party and later rose to the position of First Vice Premier of the People's Republic of China.

Role in the 1989 Tiananmen Square Protests
During the Tiananmen Square protests of 1989, Yao Yilin held the position of First Vice Premier of the People's Republic of China and was responsible for economic planning and management. Yao was associated with the conservative side of the party which denied that the students were patriotic and advocated a quick suppression to the movement. Yao Yilin and Li Peng were both able to effectively oppose Zhao Ziyang in order to ensure that conservative influence would dominate the decisions made in the CCP.

Involvement with April 26 Editorial
The April 26 editorial published in the People's Daily angered the students and greatly contributed to the growing numbers in the square. The official report of the Chinese Communist Party stated that the movement was not patriotic and the students were being led by a small group of anti-communist conspirators to cause "turmoil". Deng Xiaoping's own opinions were placed in the editorial to help support it and ensure that the people of China would obediently accept the party's view of the protests. However, two opposing sides emerged in the party: one supported keeping the editorial the same, the other wanted to change the editorial to appease the students. Yao rejected Zhao's offer to take the blame for changing the party's opinion of the movement because the people would begin to doubt the cohesiveness of the party. Yao proposed less conciliatory action with the students. Instead he wanted to further prevent other political leaders from supporting the protests, force students to end class boycotts, and maintain labor discipline in industry and commerce to keep production on track. Yao Yilin and Li Peng were the leaders of the conservative faction and gained support by siding with Deng Xiaoping's view of the protests. Deng Xiaoping held a considerable amount of honour and prestige in China because of his long term involvement with the Communist Party and his close ties with China's previous iconic leader, Mao Zedong. Yao slowly pulled support away from Zhao Ziyang's reformist faction by making his supporters believe that Zhao sided too much with the students over the clarification of the editorial. Yao Yilin attacked Zhao because he blamed the party for allowing corruption to go unchecked and making democracy and law worse in China. Zhao found himself in a difficult situation when Yao and other conservatives worked together and opposed the decisions he made with other reformers such as Chen Yizi and Bao Tong.

Justification for Martial Law
Yao Yilin and Li Peng are the two figures most associated with the initiation of martial law on June 4. The need for martial law came from the fear that the continuing stream of students entering the square were secretly coerced by anti-communist powers. Party leaders were afraid that these powers were continuing to fill Tiananmen Square with students and protesters that would only function to obstruct the CCP from governing the Chinese people. Martial law was seen by the conservative faction as the only method that could bring about a crackdown with enough force to prevent future protesters from attempting to reach the square. According to Tony Saich, Yao was such a strong supporter of martial law because he saw it as a last resort option to end the protests and return proper functioning to Beijing. In a discussion with other party leaders, Yao Yilin was quoted saying "The nature of this student movement has changed. It began as a natural expression of grief and has turned into social turmoil." He advocated that all unofficially recognized student organizations should be considered illegal because he feared they would spread the turmoil outside Beijing and throughout the rest of the country. Yao was also the only member of the Standing Committee to refuse dialogue with the students because he believed that a small group of conspirators were behind these student organizations and dialogue with them would only strengthen their ability to overthrow the CCP.  Chow Chung-Yan discusses in his article published in the South China Morning Post how Li Peng and Yao Yilin favoured martial law because it would allow the hardliners to hold the power they had in the country.

Death
Yao died of an illness on December 11, 1994. He was 77 years old.

Family
Yao and his wife Hong Shouzi had four children, including daughters Yao Mingrui, Yao Mingshan, Yao Mingduan and son Yao Mingwei. Yao Mingshan's husband is the current Chinese Vice President Wang Qishan. Yao Mingduan's husband is Meng Xuenong, the former Governor of Shanxi and former Mayor of Beijing.

References

1917 births
1994 deaths
Alternate members of the 8th Central Committee of the Chinese Communist Party
Burials at Babaoshan Revolutionary Cemetery
Chinese Communist Party politicians
Delegates to the 1st National People's Congress
Directors of the General Office of the Chinese Communist Party
First vice premiers of the People's Republic of China
Members of the 10th Central Committee of the Chinese Communist Party
Members of the 11th Central Committee of the Chinese Communist Party
Members of the 12th Politburo of the Chinese Communist Party
Members of the 13th Politburo Standing Committee of the Chinese Communist Party
People's Republic of China politicians from Hong Kong
Vice Premiers of the People's Republic of China